Wood owl refers to several species of owls of genus Strix, with a round face and no ear-tufts
 Spotted wood owl, Strix seloputo
 Mottled wood owl, Strix ocellata
 Brown wood owl, Strix leptogrammica
 Bartels's wood owl or Javan wood owl, Strix (leptogrammica) bartelsi
 Himalayan wood owl, Strix (leptogrammica) newarensis
 Barred owl, Strix varia (also called wood owl)
 African wood owl, Strix woodfordii (formerly Ciccaba woodfordii)